Nimax Theatres Ltd. is a theatre group owned and operated by Nica Burns and Max Weitzenhoffer. In July 2005, Weitzenhoffer and Burns announced they were forming Nimax to buy four of London’s playhouses from Andrew Lloyd Webber, namely the Apollo Theatre, Garrick Theatre, Duchess Theatre and Lyric Theatre, taking control the following October. Additionally, Weitzenhoffer had already owned the Vaudeville Theatre since January 2001; it was transferred in September 2005 to the newly formed company.

In April 2012, Nimax purchased the Palace Theatre from Lloyd Webber.

In Autumn 2022, Nimax will open @sohoplace, the first newly-built West End theatre to open in 50 years

Theatres 
The group owns and operates seven West End theatres:
 Apollo Theatre
 Duchess Theatre
 Garrick Theatre
 Lyric Theatre
 Palace Theatre
 Vaudeville Theatre
 @sohoplace

Notes

External links 
 

Theatres in the City of Westminster
West End theatre
Leisure companies of the United Kingdom
British theatre managers and producers
Companies based in the City of Westminster
West End theatres
Theatre in London